Karriena Shah is an Indian actress, model and vlogger who appears in Tollywood films. She is a face of the Abbott 2019 and brand ambassador of Ayurcare perfect figure. She also appears in Hindi television series, like secret diary channel v, Pyaar Tune Kya Kiya season 3 and season 9, CID, Savdhaan India, and Aahat (season 6). She did many TV ads, album songs, hoardings, cover pages and is a face of many products. She also represented India in a German movie worked with jullian benedickt. She is lead in a Tamil movie Beauty realised on March 2023 in opposite actor Rishi

Television
Zing's Pyaar Tune Kya Kiya
Sony TV's CID and Aahat (season 6)
Life OK's Savdhaan India
secret diary channel v

References

Living people
Actresses in Telugu cinema
Indian film actresses
Indian television actresses
Actresses in Hindi television
Year of birth missing (living people)
Actresses from Mumbai
Place of birth missing (living people)
21st-century Indian actresses